Leribe may refer to:
 Hlotse or Leribe, market town in Lesotho founded in 1876
 Leribe District, a district in Lesotho